Kal Hill Segrist (April 14, 1931 – June 26, 2015) was a utility infielder in Major League Baseball who played for the New York Yankees (1952) and Baltimore Orioles (1955). Listed at 6' 0", 180 lb., Segrist batted and threw right-handed. He later became a coach for the Texas Tech Red Raiders.

Early life
Segrist attended W. H. Adamson High School in Dallas. He then attended the University of Texas at Austin, and played for the Texas Longhorns.

Professional career
In a two-season career, Segrist was a .125 hitter (4-for-32) with four runs and one RBI in 20 games. He did not hit for any extra bases. In 17 infield appearances, he played at second base (12), third base (4) and first base (1), and posted a collective .977 fielding percentage (one error in 43 chances).

Trade
Before the 1955 season, in the largest transaction in major league history, the Yankees sent Segrist along with Harry Byrd, Don Leppert, Jim McDonald, Bill Miller, Willy Miranda, Hal Smith, Gus Triandos, Gene Woodling, and Ted Del Guercio to Baltimore in exchange for Mike Blyzka, Jim Fridley, Billy Hunter, Darrell Johnson, Dick Kryhoski, Don Larsen and Bob Turley.

Coaching career
Segrist was an assistant coach for the Texas Tech Red Raiders under Berl Huffman from 1965–1967. He replaced Huffman as head baseball coach from 1968 to 1983.

Personal life
Segrist then returned to college and received his bachelor's degree from North Texas State University in 1962.  Segrist and his wife, Becky, have four children, Khris, Scott, Sunny Beth and Samuel.

References

External links

 Obituary

1931 births
2015 deaths
Major League Baseball infielders
Baltimore Orioles players
New York Yankees players
Texas Longhorns baseball players
Texas Tech Red Raiders baseball coaches
University of Texas at Austin alumni
Baseball players from Texas
Kansas City Blues (baseball) players
Toronto Maple Leafs (International League) players
San Antonio Missions players
Vancouver Mounties players
Dallas Rangers players
Sacramento Solons players
Victoria Rosebuds players
Mobile Bears players
University of North Texas alumni
W. H. Adamson High School alumni